This was a new event in 2013. Yulia Putintseva was the top seed, but lost to Marta Sirotkina in the quarterfinals.

Elina Svitolina won the title, defeating Sirotkina in the final, 6–3, 3–6, 7–5.

Seeds

Main draw

Finals

Top half

Bottom half

References 
 Main draw

Vanessa Phillips Women's Tournament - Singles